Khatra is a census town in the Khatra community development block in the Khatra subdivision of the Bankura district in the state of West Bengal, India. It is the headquarters of the Khatra subdivision.

Geography

Location
Khatra is in the south-west of Bankura District, which is itself to the west of the southern part of West Bengal.

The Kangsabati irrigation project partly covers the Khatra sub-division, with the Kangsabati dam being important for farming in the districts of Bankura and Paschim Medinipur.

Area overview
The map alongside shows the Khatra subdivision of Bankura district. Physiographically, this area is having uneven lands with hard rocks. In the Khatra CD block area there are some low hills. The Kangsabati project reservoir is prominently visible in the map. The subdued patches of shaded area in the map show forested areas It is an almost fully rural area.

Note: The map alongside presents some of the notable locations in the subdivision. All places marked in the map are linked in the larger full screen map.

Demographics
According to the 2011 Census of India, Khatra had a total population of 7,382 of which 3,774 (51%) were males and 3,608 (49%) were females. Population below 6 years was 672. The total number of literates in Khatra was 5,658 (84.32% of the population over 6 years).

.*For language details see Khatra (community development block)#Language and religion

Civic administration

Police stations
Khatra police station has jurisdiction over the Khatra  CD block. The area covered is 229.68 km2 with a population of 117,022.
Khatra Subdivision Women police station started on 1 July 2016 and has jurisdiction over whole of the Khatra subdivision.

CD block HQ
The headquarters of the Khatra CD block are located at Khatra.

Infrastructure
According to the District Census Handbook 2011, Bankura, Khatra covered an area of 1.6161 km2. Among the civic amenities, it had 11 km of roads with open drains, the protected water supply involved tap water from treated sources, tubewell/ borewell. It had 1,005 domestic electric connections, 221 road lighting points. Among the medical facilities it had 1 hospital, 5 dispensaries/ health centres, 2 maternity and child welfare centres, 1 veterinary hospital. Among the educational facilities it had were 4 primary schools, 2 middle schools, 2 secondary schools, 2 senior secondary schools, the nearest general degree college at Supur 3 km away. It had 1 recognised shorthand, typewriting and vocational training institute, 4 non-formal education centres (Sarva Shiksha Abhiyan). It had the branch of 1 cooperative bank.

Education
Khatra Adibasi Mahavidyalaya is an undergraduate college, located 3 km away from Khatra town, was established in 1979. Affiliated with Bankura University it offers honours courses in Bengali, Santali, English, Sanskrit, history, philosophy, accountancy and mathematics. It also offers general courses in arts, science and commerce.

Khatra Higher Secondary School is a Bengali-medium coeducational institution established in 1920. It has facilities for teaching from class V to class XII. The school has 21 computers, a library with 800 books and a playground.

Khatra Girls Higher Secondary School is a Bengali-medium girls only institution established in 1959. It has facilities for teaching from class V to class XII. The school has 14 computers and a library with 3,000 books.

Kangsabati Sishu Vidyalaya is a Bengali-medium coeducational institution established in 1973. It has facilities for teaching from class V to class XII. The school has 10 computers, a library with 1,050 books and a playground.

Healthcare
Khatra has a Subdivisional Hospital with 100 beds. There was no sub-divisional hospital until 2006. After delays due to water shortage, the hospital was opened by West Bengal Chief Minister Buddhadeb Bhattacharya, on 18 November 2006.

Simla Block Primary Health Centre, with 10 beds at Khatra, is the major government medical facility in the Khatra CD block. There is a primary health centre at Bonabaid (Kankradara) (with 10 beds).

Culture
The Golden Jubilee of the Kangsabati movement was celebrated in Khatra on 30 August–31, 2006.

The Bratachari movement, pioneered by Gurusaday Dutt, has much support in the area.

References

External links
 

Cities and towns in Bankura district